Lee Gi-kwang (born March 30, 1990), known professionally as Gikwang or Kikwang, is a South Korean singer, songwriter and actor. He originally debuted as solo singer with the stage name AJ (Ace Junior), releasing his first mini album First Episode: A New Hero on April 4, 2009. In October 2009, he debuted as the main dancer, visual and a lead vocalist of boy group BEAST, which was renamed Highlight in February 2017.

He began his acting career with a supporting role in the popular television sitcom High Kick Through the Roof (2009–10) and had supporting roles in dramas My Princess (2011), Me Too, Flower! (2011), Mrs. Cop (2015), Monster (2016), Circle (2017), and Lovely Horribly (2018),  He also became an MC for various shows such as Hot Brothers and Inkigayo.

Early life and career
Lee Gi-kwang was born on March 30, 1990 in Naju, South Korea. Gi-kwang found interest in hip hop and had particular liking to many classic hip hop acts. At first he was backed by his family to pursue a musical career but eventually he passed an audition and became a trainee. He was trained under JYP Entertainment for four years before being eliminated. He was asked by the former president of Cube Entertainment to join the agency without auditioning, making him the company's first trainee.

He was known as the solo singer AJ or Ace Junior when he debuted and released a mini-album First Episode: A New Hero on April 4, 2009. He made his debut on April 2, 2009 on Mnet M!Countdown, and dubbed by Korean media as the next Rain. However he met controversies when his name created dispute among netizens for having a similar name with Paran's AJ (who later became a U-KISS member). He now goes with his original name when he re-debuted with Beast. On June 17, 2009, AJ opened for Lady Gaga's Korean showcase. Fellow Beast members Yoon Doo-joon, Yong Jun-hyung, Jang Hyun-seung and Yang Yo-seob participated as backup dancers for AJ before debuting in Beast. AJ also featured in reality show, Diary of AJ, which was hosted by MTV. The show ran on two episodes on May 9, 2009 with a total of two episodes showcasing his journey on his debut as AJ.

Career

2009–2016: Debut with Beast and solo activities 
Six months after debuting as soloist, Gi-kwang was chosen to debut as member of Beast, originally known as B2ST, an acronym for "Boys 2 Search the Top". However, their name was changed to BEAST (acronym for "Boys of East Asia Standing Tall"). The group debuted in October 2009. Gi-kwang made his acting debut in the MBC sitcom High Kick Through the Roof, which aired in 2009 and 2010.

In 2010, Gi-kwang featured in K.Will's music video for the song, "Present". He was also selected as the MC for MBC's Sunday Sunday Night segment Hot Brothers and the KBS talk show Win Win. In May, Gi-kwang was chosen as the model for the 'Ice Tea Tio' from DongSuh Foods. In August, Gi-kwang featured on Ahn Jinkyung's single "Love is Pathetic" from the mini album Be the Voice as a rapper. He, Yoon Doojoon and IU appeared as special hosts on Music Core on August 21, 2010. On December 29, Gi-kwang was awarded with Popularity Award from the 2010 MBC Entertainment Awards. 

Gi-kwang, together with IU, were selected to be new MCs of Inkigayo in replacement of CNBlue's Jung Yonghwa from March 20, 2011. The two were paired with the existing MCs, 2AM's Jo Kwon, and f(x)'s Sulli. He was also chosen as the leading man in A Pink's music video, "I Don't Know" Sunny Hill's music video for "Midnight Circus". In July, Gi-kwang was featured on Brave Brothers' song "Break Up" alongside Electroboyz, as a part of Brave Brother's sixth project album on July 12, 2011. 

Also in 2011, Gi-kwang was cast in the romantic comedy drama My Princess starring Song Seung-hun and Kim Tae-hee; and played Lee Ji-ah's patrol partner in the drama Me Too, Flower!. Gi-kwang won the Best New Actor award at the SBS Drama Awards for his performance in My Princess.   

On February 8, 2012 Gi-kwang appeared in Ailee's debut music video, "Heaven". Gi-kwang also hosted  SBS K-Pop Super Concert in America on November 10 alongside Tiffany Hwang and Jung Yong-hwa and Melon Music Awards with Infinite's Woohyun, Moon Hee-jun, and Danny Ahn. 

In 2013, Gi-kwang had a role as a terminally ill patient with leukemia on KBS Drama Special My Friend is Still Alive. In 2014, he starred in the mobile drama 20's (Twenty Years Old). 

In 2015, Gi-kwang was cast in SBS's drama Mrs. Cop as the youngest detective on the team. He next starred as the younger version of Kang Ji-hwan's character in the 2016 MBC drama Monster, and the web drama Momin's Room.

2017–present: Return to solo music career
In September 2017, Gi-kwang returned as a soloist with his first mini album One. The lead single was a future R&B single titled "What You Like". Gi-kwang reportedly participated in 6 out of 8 tracks on the album. He held his first solo concert Lee Gikwang Mini Live 2018 One in January 2018.

Also in 2017, Gi-kwang was cast in tvN's science fiction drama Circle.  In 2018, Gi-kwang was cast in KBS' horror romance drama Lovely Horribly.

On April 18, 2019, Gi-kwang began his mandatory military service as a conscripted police officer. He was discharged on November 18, 2020.

Discography

Extended plays

Singles

As lead artist

As featured artist

Collaborations

Music videos

Songwriting credits

Filmography

Film

Television series

Television shows

Web shows

Radio show

Hosting

Concerts

Korean tours 

 LEEGIKWANG Mini LIVE 2018 <ONE> - Blue Square I Market Hall, Seoul (January 27–28, 2018) 

 LEEGIKWANG LIVE 2019 [I] - Blue Square I Market Hall, Seoul (March 23-24, 2019)

Japan tours 

 LEEGIKWANG Mini LIVE 2018 <ONE> in Japan - Mynavi BLITZ Akasaka, Tokyo (July 22, 2018)

 LEEGIKWANG LIVE 2019 [I] in Japan - Toyosu PIT by Team Smile, Tokyo (13 April, 2019)

Taiwan tours 
 LEEGIKWANG LIVE 2019 [I] in Taiwan - Taiwan TICC Hall, Taipei (30 March, 2019)

Awards and nominations

References

External links

Highlight (band) members
1990 births
Cube Entertainment artists
K-pop singers
Living people
People from Gwangju
People from Naju
South Korean male singers
South Korean pop singers
South Korean male television actors
South Korean male film actors
South Korean dance musicians
South Korean male idols